"Summertime" is a song performed by Belgian musician and songwriter Selah Sue from her self-titled debut album Selah Sue. It was released on the 4 November 2011 as a Digital download in Belgium. The song was written by Sanne Putseys and produced by Patrice.

Track listing

Credits and personnel
Lead vocals – Selah Sue
Producers – Patrice
Lyrics – Sanne Putseys
Label: Because Music

Chart performance

Release history

References

2011 singles
Selah Sue songs
2011 songs
Songs written by Selah Sue
Because Music singles